Tropidophorus davaoensis, also known as the Davao waterside skink, is a species of skink. It is endemic to Mindanao, the Philippines.

References

davaoensis
Reptiles of the Philippines
Endemic fauna of the Philippines
Fauna of Mindanao
Reptiles described in 1980
Taxa named by James Patterson Bacon